The sovereign of the United Kingdom may award a royal family order to female members of the British Royal Family, as they typically do not wear the commemorative medals that men do. The order is a personal memento rather than a state decoration. The same practice is in place in the royal families of Norway, Sweden, Denmark, Thailand, and Tonga.

History

The first Royal Family Order was issued during and after the regency of George IV. Prior to 1820, he started the practice of presenting the order to ladies and gentlemen of the Court, particularly female members of the Royal family. His order was rather ornate in appearance, and the frame that surrounded his portrait was of diamond oak leaves and acorns. The badge was suspended from a white silk bow which varied for men and women. As a young woman, Princess Victoria of Kent (later Queen Victoria) received this badge from her uncle.

After George IV, each succeeding sovereign, except William IV and Edward VIII, has issued his or her own Royal Family Order.

A slight variation in the practice of the Royal Family Order came with the reign of Queen Victoria. When Victoria came to the throne there was no Royal Family Order until after her marriage. She created her Royal Order of Victoria and Albert in 1862, which then served as her Royal Family Order. The order consisted of a cameo portrait of Victoria and Albert, and was suspended from a white ribbon. No other Royal Family Order has depicted both the sovereign and the sovereign's consort.

Similar royal badges
Those who served as Mistress of the Robes to Elizabeth II received a badge of office which was distinct from the Royal Family Order but designed along similar lines: a jeweled royal cypher worn on a yellow ribbon; it was worn on State occasions and at other events, as appropriate. The Queen's other Ladies-in-Waiting wore their own distinctive badge: a jeweled letter 'E' within an oval frame, worn on a pink silk ribbon.

Insignia

The badge of the order consists of a portrait of the Sovereign set in diamonds, which is suspended from a ribbon. The ribbon of each Royal Family Order changes with each monarch: Edward VII's was variegated of red, blue, and white (similar to the colors of the Royal Victorian Order) and George VI's was rose pink. Each contained a portrait of the sovereign, usually in uniform (if male), or evening dress (if female). The reverse of the order contains the royal cypher of the sovereign.

The Royal Family Order of Queen Elizabeth II depicted The Queen in evening dress wearing the ribbon and star of the Order of the Garter. The miniature, painted on ivory (glass since 2017), and was bordered by diamonds and surmounted by a Tudor crown in diamonds and red enamel. The reverse, in silver-gilt, was patterned with rays and depicts the royal cypher and St Edward's Crown in gold and enamel. The watered silk ribbon was chartreuse yellow and formed into a bow.

Wearing the Order

The Royal Family Orders are worn pinned to the left shoulder at formal evening occasions when other orders and decorations are worn. If a sash is worn also over the left shoulder, the order is pinned to the sash. If more than one Royal Family Order is worn, they are layered, with the most recent uppermost.

Gallery

List of Royal Family Orders of the United Kingdom
 Royal Family Order of George IV
 Royal Order of Victoria and Albert
 Royal Family Order of Edward VII
 Royal Family Order of George V
 Royal Family Order of George VI
 Royal Family Order of Elizabeth II

References

External links
Images of all Royal Family Orders at medals.org.uk

Orders of chivalry of the United Kingdom
British royal family
Royal family orders